Egon Hilbert (19 May 1899 – 18 January 1968) was an Austrian opera/theatre director.

Hilbert was born in Vienna, Austria where he would later study law and philosophy at the Universität Wien.

In 1938, he was arrested by the Nazis and interned at Dachau concentration camp. In 1945, he was made provisional director of the Salzburger Landestheaters and attempted a reorganisation of the Salzburg Festival. From 1946 to 1953, he was head of the Austrian national theater administration. In 1953, after a brief suspension, he resigned as director of the Vienna State Opera. From 1954 to 1959 he was he was chief of the Austrian cultural institute in Rome. From 1959, he was general director of the Vienna Festival, and from 1963 until his death, he was the director of the Vienna State Opera.

Honors and awards
 Officer of the Académie française
 Goldene Ehrenmedaille der Stadt Wien

References

External links
 
 Egon Hilbert und der Iffland-Ring
 Wiener Staatsoper

 

1899 births
1968 deaths
Male conductors (music)
Opera managers
Austrian theatre directors
Musicians from Vienna
University of Vienna alumni
Dachau concentration camp survivors
20th-century Austrian conductors (music)
20th-century Austrian male musicians